Mebanazine (trade name Actomol) is a monoamine oxidase inhibitor (MAOI) of the hydrazine chemical class that was previously used as an antidepressant in the 1960s, but has since been withdrawn due to hepatotoxicity.

Mebanazine in animals is claimed to be a more potent MAOI than pheniprazine with a greater therapeutic index.

See also 
 Hydrazine (antidepressant)

References 

Hepatotoxins
Hydrazines
Monoamine oxidase inhibitors
Withdrawn drugs